The Brighton Miracle is a 2019 Australian-made film written and directed by Max Mannix about the lead-up to the Japan national rugby union team's unexpected win over South Africa at the 2015 Rugby World Cup, told through a combination of drama and documentary. Temuera Morrison plays Japan coach Eddie Jones and Lasarus Ratuere plays team captain Michael Leitch.

Plot
The story of one of the greatest sporting upsets in history, when Japan beat two-time world champions South Africa at the 2015 Rugby World Cup.

Cast
 Temuera Morrison as Eddie Jones
 Lasarus Ratuere as Michael Leitch
 Sumire Matsubara as Satomi Leitch
 Yûki Kudô as Nellie Jones
 Masa Yamaguchi as JR
 Yutaka Izumihara as Ayumi Goromaru

References

External links
 

2019 biographical drama films
2010s sports films
2019 films
Cultural depictions of rugby footballers
Rugby union films
2015 Rugby World Cup
2019 drama films
2010s English-language films